Sylla M'Mah Touré (born 3 December 1978) is a Guinean sprinter. She competed in the women's 100 metres at the 2000 Summer Olympics.

References

1978 births
Living people
Athletes (track and field) at the 1996 Summer Olympics
Athletes (track and field) at the 2000 Summer Olympics
Guinean female sprinters
Olympic athletes of Guinea
Place of birth missing (living people)
Olympic female sprinters